is a Japanese professional baseball Pitcher for the Fukuoka SoftBank Hawks of Nippon Professional Baseball.

Professional career
On October 26, 2017, Ogata was drafted as a developmental player by the Fukuoka Softbank Hawks in the 2017 Nippon Professional Baseball draft.

From 2018 to 2019 season, he played in informal matches against the Shikoku Island League Plus's teams and amateur baseball teams, and played in the Western League of NPB second league.

On March 16, 2020, Ogata signed a 6 million yen contract yen with the Fukuoka SoftBank Hawks as a registered player under control.) On June 23, Ogata debuted in the Pacific League against the Saitama Seibu Lions as a relief pitcher. In 2020 season, he pitched only one game in the Pacific League.

In 2021 season, he finished the regular season with 8 Games pitched, a 0–0 Win–loss record, a 0.87 ERA, and a 9 strikeouts in 10.1 innings.

On April 5, 2022, Ogata scored his first win against the Orix Buffaloes as a relief pitcher. In 2022 season, he finished the regular season with 9 Games pitched, a 1–0 Win–loss record, a 5.56 ERA, and a 11 strikeouts in 11.1 innings.

References

External links

 Career statistics - NPB.jp
 39 Shuto Ogata PLAYERS2022 - Fukuoka SoftBank Hawks Official site

1999 births
Living people
Fukuoka SoftBank Hawks players
Japanese baseball players
Nippon Professional Baseball pitchers
Baseball people from Miyagi Prefecture